Ferry Plantation House, or Old Donation Farm, Ferry Farm, Walke Manor House, is a brick house in the neighborhood of Old Donation Farm in Virginia Beach, Virginia. The site dates back to 1642 when Savill Gaskin started the second ferry service in Hampton Roads to carry passengers on the Lynnhaven River to the nearby county courthouse and to visit plantations along the waterway. A cannon was used to signal the ferry, which had 11 total stops along the river. The first ferry service was started nearby by Adam Thoroughgood.

The house, which is reputedly haunted by 11 spirits, has been used as a plantation, courthouse, school, and post office. It is currently a museum and educational center. A Summer History Camp, which educates youths about life in the 18th and 19th centuries, is also held on the site.

Description
The area was initially cleared by the local Indians in the 16th century and many of their artifacts have been found on the site. The third Princess Anne County courthouse, the first brick courthouse in the county, was built on this site, complete with stocks and pillory. This third courthouse was in existence from 1735 until the construction of the Walke Mansion. The Walke Mansion (1751-1828), owned by William Walke, was destroyed by fire on September 12, 1828. Walke may have run a tavern here during the American Revolution.

The current house was built in 1830. Its exterior is Federal style three-course American bond brickwork; all of the bricks were from the ruins of the Walke Mansion. A West Bay addition was built in 1850. The house has 10 rooms with heart-of-pine flooring and several original features. It was once covered with oyster shell stucco. The rear of the home faces the western branch of the Lynnhaven River.

There are some small gardens on the property and in the back yard is a large Southern Magnolia planted on April 6, 1863, by Sally Rebecca Walke in memory of her fiancé.

Renovation
Virginia Higgins moved out of Ferry Plantation in 1986 and turned the deed over to the City of Virginia Beach. The Ferry Plantation House was abandoned from 1986 to 1996. A group of citizens saved the house from demolition around 1996. Investors bought it in 1994, but their deal to sell it fell through in 1996 when the Virginia Beach City Council said the house could not be a private residence due to deed restrictions. The deed to the property was eventually turned over to the City of Virginia Beach in June 1996, and the Friends of the Ferry Plantation House, Inc. began renovating the house in 1996 in partnership with the City of Virginia Beach. Court House bars (one set and shackles) are still on one window to date.

The house was listed in the Virginia Landmarks Register (Virginia Historic Landmark) in 2004 and the US National Register of Historic Places in 2005 and The +Virginia State Register.

Belinda Nash has been on the board of directors of the FOFPH since 1996 and the director since 1999. Nash is one of the many volunteers that continue to work to allow The Ferry Plantation House to be enjoyed by so many, including summer camps and many social events that share its history and artifacts.

Hauntings
The house is reportedly haunted by 11 spirits; spirit tours are available, including one during Halloween called "The Stroll of Lost Souls". Reported spirits include those of people who perished in an 1810 ship wreck at the ferry landing, a former slave, Sally Rebecca Walke, who mourns her fiancé, a fallen soldier, and the Lady in White, who reportedly died of a broken neck from falling down the stairs, as well as the artist Thomas Williamson, owner of the Manor House who was married to a Walke has been reported seen at the top of the stairs painting. Paranormal groups come to the house to do research. Sounds of dragging chains have been reported, possibly from the days of the old courthouse.

Grace Sherwood, the "Witch of Pungo", was tried by ducking near here and the museum sponsors the annual Grace Sherwood Festival, which includes viewing of the reenactment of the ducking. The actual ducking of Sherwood was at the end of what is now Witchduck Road, 200 yards out in the river from what is now a private home.  The House has a Red Maple and marker in honor of Sherwood in the side yard.

See also
 List of the oldest buildings in Virginia
 National Register of Historic Places listings in Virginia Beach, Virginia
 Reportedly haunted locations in the United States

Notes

External links

Official website
Summer tours put Beach history on center stage 

Houses completed in 1830
Reportedly haunted locations in Virginia
Museums in Virginia Beach, Virginia
Historic house museums in Virginia
Houses on the National Register of Historic Places in Virginia
Federal architecture in Virginia
Museums established in 1996
Houses in Virginia Beach, Virginia
National Register of Historic Places in Virginia Beach, Virginia
1996 establishments in Virginia
1830 establishments in Virginia